Otto Pukk (29 November 1900 Loona, Saare County – 14 February 1951 Stockholm) was an Estonian politician and lawyer. He was a member of the Estonian National Assembly and III,  V and VI Riigikogu.

Since 1939 he was the chairman of VI Riigikogu (Riigivolikogu).

References

1900 births
1951 deaths
Members of the Riigikogu, 1926–1929
Members of the Riigikogu, 1932–1934
Members of the Estonian National Assembly
Estonian military personnel of the Estonian War of Independence
Recipients of the Order of the White Star, 1st Class
Estonian World War II refugees
Estonian emigrants to Sweden
University of Tartu alumni
People from Saaremaa Parish
Members of the Riigivolikogu